This page lists the fossiliferous stratigraphic units in Central America.

Belize

El Salvador

Guatemala

Honduras

Nicaragua

Costa Rica

Panama

See also 

 Lists of fossiliferous stratigraphic units in North America
 List of fossiliferous stratigraphic units in Mexico
 List of fossiliferous stratigraphic units in Colombia
 List of fossiliferous stratigraphic units in the Caribbean

References

Bibliography 
Honduras
 

Central America
Central America
Central America
Geology of Central America
Central America-related lists
Geology-related lists
Geology of Belize